Helen Joy Stother (21 June 1955 – 8 October 2019) was an English cricketer and former member of the England women's cricket team who played as a right-arm medium bowler. She appeared in 7 Test matches and 12 One Day Internationals between 1982 and 1986. She played domestic cricket for Sussex and Middlesex.

References

External links
 

1955 births
2019 deaths
England women Test cricketers
England women One Day International cricketers
Sussex women cricketers
Middlesex women cricketers